Osborn v. Bank of the United States, 22 U.S. (9 Wheat.) 738 (1824), was a case set in the Banking Crisis of 1819, when many banks, including the Second Bank of the United States, demanded repayment for loans that they had issued on credit that they did not have. This led to an economic downturn and a shortage of money. In 1819, Ohio passed a law that put a tax on the Bank of the United States on the theory that taxing a bank would allow the state government to receive and distribute the scarce money.

On September 17, 1819, Ohio Auditor Ralph Osborn was given permission to seize $100,000 from a branch of the Bank of the United States. However, his agents mistakenly took $120,000 although the extra $20,000 was promptly returned. The bank chose to sue Osborn for the return of the additional $100,000, and a federal court ruled that Osborn violated a court order, prohibiting the taxing of the bank.

Osborn argued that he had never been properly served with the order but still had to return the money. A problem arose when Osborn could pay back only $98,000, as the other $2,000 had been used to pay the salary of Osborn's tax agents.

In 1824, the Supreme Court ruled in favor of the Bank of the United States, ordering the return of the disputed $2,000.

See also
 List of United States Supreme Court cases, volume 22

Notes

External links

United States Supreme Court cases
United States Supreme Court cases of the Marshall Court
United States Constitution Article Three case law
United States Eleventh Amendment case law
1824 in United States case law
1824 in Ohio
Legal history of Ohio